Saeed Al-Rubaie (born 4 June 1994) is a Saudi Arabian professional footballer who currently plays as a defender for Al-Shabab.

Personal life
Saeed is the brother of the players Hamad Al-Rabaei and Abdullah Al-Rubaie and the cousin of the players Mohammed Al Rubaie and Masoud Al-Rubaie.

Career statistics

Club

Honours
Al-Ettifaq
Saudi First Division: 2015–16

References

External links 
 

1994 births
Living people
People from Najran
Saudi Arabian footballers
Saudi Arabia youth international footballers
Al-Okhdood Club players
Al-Ahli Saudi FC players
Ettifaq FC players
Al-Faisaly FC players
Al-Shabab FC (Riyadh) players
Saudi First Division League players
Saudi Professional League players
Association football defenders